The Abyssinian owl or African long-eared owl (Asio abyssinicus) is a medium-sized true owl.

Description
The Abyssinian owl has dark brown eyes, a black bill and gray eyebrows. It is similar in appearance to the long-eared owl, Asio otus, but their ranges do not overlap, and the Abyssinian owl is darker. It has prominent dark brown, white-edged ear-tufts that are slightly centrally located on the head.

Behavior and reproduction
Asio abyssinicus is a nocturnal owl. It uses the nests of other birds to raise its offspring. The claws of the Abyssinian owl are significantly stronger than other members of the genus; as a result a wider range of prey is available, including smaller birds, field mice, and shrews.

Distribution
The Abyssinian owl prefers open grasslands or moorlands with oak or cedar forests, and it is found in mountain valleys and gorges at elevations of up to  a.s.l.. It lives in the Albertine Rift montane forests, Ethiopia and northern Kenya. This species is classified as least concern by IUCN due to its very large range. However, the species is described as "rare to scarce" when seeking to identify one.

References

Abyssinian owl
Birds of East Africa
Owls of Sub-Saharan Africa
Fauna of the Ethiopian Highlands
Abyssinian owl